Joseph David Magrane (born July 2, 1964) is an American former Major League Baseball (MLB) pitcher who played for the St. Louis Cardinals, California Angels, and Chicago White Sox between 1987 and 1996, and is currently a color commentary broadcaster for the MLB Network.

Playing career

Amateur

In 1984, Magrane played collegiate summer baseball for the Harwich Mariners of the Cape Cod Baseball League (CCBL). He led the league in wins and threw six complete games. Magrane was the winning pitcher at the league's 1984 all-star game at Philadelphia's Veterans Stadium, where he pitched two shutout innings. He was inducted into the CCBL Hall of Fame in 2009.

Professional

During his rookie season he helped the Cardinals win the 1987 National League pennant, starting Game 1 and Game 7 (the first pitcher to do so with no starts between those two games), taking the loss in Game 1.  He also led the National League in hit batsmen, with 10.

He led the National League in ERA (2.18) in 1988, despite winning only five games (losing nine).  He holds the distinction of the fewest wins by an ERA leader, excluding strike seasons.  He finished 4th in voting for the 1989 NL Cy Young with an 18-9 win–loss record, a 2.91 ERA and surrendered only 5 home runs in 234 innings.

An injured elbow in 1990 cost him almost all of the next two seasons and most of his effectiveness, and he never regained his early form. He won 11 games between the St. Louis and California ball clubs in 1993, but could not muster more than 2 wins or 74 innings pitched in any other season until his retirement in 1996 at the relatively early age of 32.

Broadcasting career
Prior to joining the MLB Network, Magrane was teamed with play-by-play announcer Dewayne Staats from 1998 to 2008 as part of the Tampa Bay Rays television team, and also served as an analyst for NBC Sports' coverage of baseball at the 2008 Summer Olympics.

Personal life

Magrane and his wife Renee, have two daughters, Shannon and Sophia. In 2012, Shannon was a finalist on the 11th season of American Idol .

See also

List of Major League Baseball annual ERA leaders

References

External links

1964 births
Living people
American expatriate baseball players in Canada
Arizona Wildcats baseball players
Arkansas Travelers players
Baseball players from Des Moines, Iowa
California Angels players
Chicago White Sox players
Harwich Mariners players
Johnson City Cardinals players
Lake Elsinore Storm players
Louisville Redbirds players
Major League Baseball broadcasters
Major League Baseball pitchers
MLB Network personalities
Nashville Sounds players
National League ERA champions
Ottawa Lynx players
St. Petersburg Cardinals players
St. Louis Cardinals players
Tampa Bay Rays announcers
Vancouver Canadians players
Alaska Goldpanners of Fairbanks players